The Wayward Son is a 1914 silent short film directed by Harry C. Mathews and produced by the Victor Company.

It is preserved in the Library of Congress collection.

Cast
Charles Hutchison - The Wayward Son
Elsie Albert - The Son's Sweetheart
Charles Manley - The Father

References

External links
 The Wayward Son at IMDb.com

1914 films
American silent short films
American black-and-white films
1910s American films